Snockgrass is a 1980 folk album by Michael Hurley. The album was released by Rounder Records.

The album places emphasis on Hurley's vocals. There is traditional folk influenced by freakbeat, blues and jazz. Lyrics on the tracks tend to be serious, satirical, and humorous. Hurley would even shift tone in the middle of a song, creating humor out of a serious situation or vice versa.

Track listing

Side one
 "Midnite Rounder" – 3:09
 "O My Stars" – 3:29
 "Tia Marie" – 4:01
 "I'm Gettin' Ready to Go" - 3:52
 "Watchin' the Show" – 3:34
 "Automatic Slim & the Fat Boys" – 4:05

Side two
 "Don't Treat Me Bad" – 2:32
 "I Heard the Voice of a Porkchop" (Jim Jackson) – 2:46
 "No Home" – 2:02
 "Jolé Blon" – 2:34
 "I Think I'll Move" – 3:23
 "Goin' to Florida" – 3:42
 "You Gonna Look Like a Monkey" (Williams, Hall) - 3:57

1997 CD release bonus tracks
 "Sweet Lucy" (alternative take) - 4:02
 "Grapefruit Juice Blues" - 4:24

References

Michael Hurley (musician) albums
1980 albums